Marzia Kjellberg (born 21 October 1992) is an Italian Internet personality and businesswoman. Known for her videos on her now-inactive YouTube channel Marzia (formerly CutiePieMarzia), Kjellberg has also ventured into writing, fashion designing and business. She is married to Swedish YouTuber PewDiePie.

Career

YouTube 
Marzia Kjellberg (then Bisognin) registered her CutiePieMarzia YouTube channel on 16 January 2012. Her videos on YouTube focused on fashion, beauty, makeup, DIY, books, movies, vlogs, haul, and video gaming. Kjellberg also commonly uploaded travel vlogs. Although Italian, Kjellberg spoke English in her videos. Kjellberg was signed to Maker Studios' sub-network, The Platform. By 2018, however, her e-commerce ventures would be managed by Re6l, a Toronto-based company involved with influencer media and e-commerce.

Kjellberg's YouTube channel was one of the most popular in the beauty and makeup genre; in May 2014, The Wall Street Journal reported that it attracted over 16 million viewers each month. The demographics of Kjellberg's viewers have been reported to be females aged 13–24, who use Kjellberg's videos as a reference. Kjellberg refers to her fans as "Marzipans".

Kjellberg appeared on her then-boyfriend Felix Kjellberg's channel on various occasions. Felix, better known on YouTube as "PewDiePie," uploaded videos of the two playing video games and participating in video challenges together. In 2014, Kjellberg and Felix were part of an online marketing campaign for the horror film, As Above, So Below. While Felix's videos for the campaign involved gaming-related topics, Kjellberg's videos centered around a travel vlog angle of the couple's trip to Paris. Similarly, ABC had Kjellberg, among others, promote their new TV series, Selfie, via a YouTube marketing campaign.

On 22 October 2018, Kjellberg uploaded a video to her channel announcing her retirement from her YouTube career. In the video she mentioned that at a point during her YouTube career, focusing on the website kept her in a bubble that negatively affected her mental health, although she resolved to reach out to others. She ended her video explaining that she was ready for "something new in [her] life." After she uploaded her final vlog, as she decided to remove her videos; she left a comment on the vlog stating, "Having videos up, after making this decision, would have seemed like taking a step back. I've selected a few that I really liked, which I'm going to leave for a bit – for the 'adjustment' period – but taking my videos down, in my mind, needed to be done." Shortly before her announcement, her YouTube channel had accumulated over 128 million video views and just under 7.5 million subscribers. Her channel's video views previously peaked in August 2017, at around 570 million.

Aside from creating content on her own channel, Kjellberg has been a voice actress in various animated web series. She voiced Carrie the Carrot in Oscar's Hotel for Fantastical Creatures. Kjellberg also voiced the character Maya, based on her own dog, in a six-episode animated web series titled Pugatory.

Fashion and design 
Kjellberg's channel's success allowed her to start designing her own clothing. Since March 2015, Kjellberg has launched several lines of fashion and design merchandise including nail polish shade, home decor products, and most notably clothing.

In 2016, she designed "Daisy" shoes through Project Shoe. That July, she launched a product line with Zoya, a nail polish brand. In June 2017, Kjellberg launched Lemon, a clothing line paired with a fragrance.

In a piece about fashion lines created by YouTube personalities, Tubefilter cited comments from Michael Fink, the dean of the School of Fashion at Savannah College of Art and Design, as well as celebrity stylist Allison Calhoun. Kjellberg's "Amore" clothing line was positively received by Fink, who stated "the gold zipper and heart applique of this skirt are right on trend, yet the A-line silhouette is timeless. You can't go wrong with this piece." Calhoun opined that "I'm personally not crazy about the patterns, colors, or cuts but I definitely can see the customer who might be. I also want to applaud Marzia and her designs for not being as topical as the others. It seems like she's making clothes that she wants to wear without a ton of inspiration from the outside world."

On 1 July 2018, Kjellberg launched Maì, a jewellery, pottery, clothing and home decor brand. The Maì ceramic accents are handcrafted by Kjellberg out of her UK-based pottery studio. She maintains that brand along with Tsuki Market, a unisex clothing and homeware brand that she owns with husband Felix Kjellberg.

Other ventures 
In January 2015, Kjellberg published a young adult fantasy/horror novel. The Italian version was published under the title La Casa Dei Sogni while the English version was published as Dream House: A Novel by CutiePieMarzia.

Personal life 
Kjellberg was born on 21 October 1992 in Arzignano, located in the Province of Vicenza, Italy.

She was introduced to her husband, Felix Kjellberg, better known online as PewDiePie, by her friend Daizo. She began dating Felix in 2011, after e-mailing him and stating that she found his videos funny. She then moved to Sweden, to live with him that October. They later moved to her native Italy, before settling together in Brighton, England. The couple lived there with their two pugs, Edgar and Maya, as well as a hedgehog named Dogy. Their relationship has been highlighted by various media outlets, with The Globe and Mail writing that her "calm personality balances out Felix's general wackiness." On 27 April 2018, Kjellberg announced on Instagram that Felix had proposed to her; on 20 August 2019, the couple announced on social media that they had married. When the two lived in Brighton, their house in Japan was burgled in late 2019; Kjellberg posted a statement online which included: "I know it is very materialistic, and should be happy with what I was left/have, but I can't hide the shock and sadness with all being taken away, just like that."

In 2022, Kjellberg and Felix moved to Japan. On 5 February 2023, the couple announced that they are expecting their first child.

Notes

References

External links 
 
 
 

1992 births
21st-century Italian businesswomen
21st-century Italian writers
Beauty and makeup YouTubers
DIY YouTubers
Fashion YouTubers
Gaming YouTubers
Italian businesspeople in fashion
Italian expatriates in England
Italian expatriates in Japan
Italian expatriates in Sweden
Italian horror writers
Italian jewellery designers
Italian voice actresses
Italian women bloggers
Italian women novelists
Italian writers of young adult literature
Lifestyle YouTubers
Living people
People from Arzignano
Revelmode people
Social media influencers
Video game commentators
Italian women fashion designers
Women video bloggers
YouTube travel vloggers